San Vito may refer to:

Persons
Saint Vitus, saint, origin of all San Vito names

Places
Bagnolo San Vito, province of Mantua
Celle di San Vito, province of Foggia
Monte San Vito, province of Ancona
San Vito, Sardinia, province of Cagliari
San Vito al Tagliamento, province of Pordenone
San Vito al Torre, province of Udine
San Vito Chietino, province of Chieti
San Vito dei Normanni, province of Brindisi
San Vito dei Normanni Air Station, United States Air Force facility
San Vito di Cadore, province of Belluno
San Vito di Fagagna, province of Udine
San Vito di Leguzzano, province of Vicenza
San Vito Lo Capo, province of Trapani
San Vito Romano, province of Rome
San Vito sullo Ionio, province of Catanzaro
San Vito, Alcamo, a former hamlet now part of Alcamo, Sicily
San Vito (Costa Rica), capital city of the canton Coto Brus, Puntarenas Province, Costa Rica
Stadio San Vito, multi-use stadium in Cosenza, Italy